The lanceolated monklet (Micromonacha lanceolata) is a species of near-passerine bird in the family Bucconidae, the puffbirds, nunlets, and nunbirds. It is found in Bolivia, Brazil, Colombia, Costa Rica, Ecuador, Panama, and Peru.

Taxonomy and systematics

The lanceolated monklet is the only member of its genus, and the only bird called a "monklet". It has no subspecies, though the population in Costa Rica and western Panama has been discussed as possibly being one.

Description

It is entirely warm brown with scale-like buffy markings above. It has white bristles around the base of the large bill, and white "whiskers", which are actually tufts of feathers. Its lores and a half ring behind the eye are white. The wings and the top side of the tail are dark brown and the tail's underside is gray. Most of its underparts are white with heavy black streaks; the center of the belly is unstreaked and the vent area has an ochre tinge.

Distribution and habitat

The lanceolated monklet is found in several disjunct areas. One is the Caribbean slope in Costa Rica and into west central Panama. Another extends from west central Colombia south to west central Ecuador. The largest area includes eastern Ecuador, southern Colombia, western Brazil, and eastern Peru. It is also found in a few locations in Bolovia. It inhabits a variety of landscapes including the edges and natural clearings of primary and mature secondary forest, small forest patches, shade coffee plantations, and lowland and montane evergreen forest. It tends to occur in the mid- and upper vegetation levels.

Behavior

Feeding

Its diet also includes berries. It sometimes follows mixed-species foraging flocks.

Breeding

The clutch of two white eggs was laid on dry leaves.

Vocalization

The lanceolated monklet's song is "1–5 high, thin, plaintive rising whistles, 'sewee ... sewee sewee-sewee-sewee’swee’swee', each slightly higher than preceding one". Its contact call is a "thin, high-pitched 'tsip tsip.

Status

The IUCN originally assessed the lanceolated monklet in 1988 as Near Threatened but since 2004 has rated it as being of Least Concern. It has a large range and a population estimated at more than 50,000 mature individuals, though the latter is thought to be decreasing. It apparently is rare to fairly common in different parts of its range, but may be underreported because it is difficult to detect.

References

External links
Lanceolated monklet photo gallery VIREO

lanceolated monklet
Birds of Costa Rica
Birds of Colombia
Birds of Ecuador
Birds of the Amazon Basin
Birds of the Peruvian Amazon
lanceolated monklet
lanceolated monklet
Taxonomy articles created by Polbot